Clarkean is an eponymous adjective and may refer to:

Samuel Clarke (1675–1729), English philosopher
Arthur C. Clarke (1917–2008), British science fiction writer and futurist